What Next, Corporal Hargrove? is a 1945 black-and-white comedy film directed by Richard Thorpe and starring Robert Walker and Keenan Wynn. It was distributed by MGM and produced by George Haight. Harry Kurnitz received an Oscar nomination for his original screenplay, What Next, Corporal Hargrove?, for this follow-up to the 1944 hit See Here, Private Hargrove.

Plot

U.S. artillery corporal Marion Hargrove finds himself at large in wartime France with wheeler-dealer pal Pvt. Thomas Mulvehill. Inadvertently detached from their outfit, Hargrove and Mulvehill wander into a French village, where they're lauded as conquering heroes by the populace.

Cast

References

External links 

 
 
 
 

1945 films
1940s war comedy films
American war comedy films
American black-and-white films
American sequel films
Films directed by Richard Thorpe
Films set in France
Metro-Goldwyn-Mayer films
Military humor in film
Films with screenplays by Harry Kurnitz
Western Front of World War II films
American World War II films
1945 comedy films
1940s English-language films
1940s American films